I kväll jag tänder ett ljus is a 1981 Stefan Borsch Christmas album, recorded by him together with among others the Swedish Radio Symphony Orchestra. In 1992, the album was re-released on CD.

Track listing

Side 1 
Jag drömmer om en jul hemma (White Christmas)
O helga natt (Cantique de noel)
Det brinner ett ljus
Ser du stjärnan i det blå (When You Wish Upon a Star)
Stilla natt (Stille Nacht, heilige Nacht)
När det lider mot jul (Det strålar en stjärna)

Side 2 
I kväll jag tänder ett ljus
Det hände sig för länge sen (Mary's Boy Child)
Låt mig få tända ett ljus (Schlafe mein Prinzchen)
Lilla klocka ring igen (On a Snowy Christmas Night)
Jag ser en stjärna på himlen (It Came Upon the Midnight Clear)
Grå jul (Blue Christmas)
Vinterbild (El noye de la mare)

Charts

References 

Stefan Borsch albums
1981 Christmas albums
Christmas albums by Swedish artists
Pop Christmas albums